Night Fever was a karaoke style show airing in the United Kingdom on Channel 5 from 5 April 1997 to 30 March 2002. It was hosted by Suggs and in the early series, he was helped by "The Big Guy in the Sky" – a disembodied voice giving the scores, and later by 'Wolfie' – John Ireland dressed as Mozart. Later series were co-hosted by Will Mellor and Sarah Cawood replaced later by Kieron Elliott and Danielle Nicholls. The programme often had themed shows such as Valentine's Day. Also, Suggs was helped (or often hindered) by Pop Monkey (a man in a costume) who supposedly gave Suggs the choices of songs.

Format
Two panels of celebrities faced a boys against girls singing contest together with quiz questions and interaction from the audience. Team captains in the early series were Craig Charles and Philippa Forrester, who were working together on BBC Two's show, Robot Wars. Special guest stars made appearances as well – these included Gary Numan, Labi Siffre and Limahl from Kajagoogoo. The format was re-developed from the French show – La Fureur (The Fury) hosted and devised by Artur – by Richard Hearsey who produced the show for Channel 5. Dawn Airey had seen the French version of the show and both Richard Hearsey and Alan Boyd travelled to Marseilles to see a live version prior to re-developing the show for Channel 5.

Transmissions

References

External links

Night Fever at BFI

1997 British television series debuts
2002 British television series endings
British panel games
1990s British game shows
2000s British game shows
Channel 5 (British TV channel) original programming
English-language television shows
Television shows produced by Thames Television
Television series by Fremantle (company)
Television series by Reg Grundy Productions
Television game shows with incorrect disambiguation